Journal of Hypertension is a peer-reviewed medical journal published by Lippincott Williams & Wilkins that was established in 1982. It is the official journal of the International Society of Hypertension and  the European Society of Hypertension. The journal is published monthly  and includes primary papers, reviews, special reports, and letters.

Since 2021, the editor-in-chief is Anthony M. Heagerty (Manchester, United Kingdom). From 2018 to 2021, the EIC was Giuseppe Mancia. According to the Journal Citation Reports, the journal has a 2020 impact factor of 4.844.

References

External links

International  Society of Hypertension
European  Society of Hypertension

Publications established in 1982
English-language journals
Monthly journals
Lippincott Williams & Wilkins academic journals
Hypertension journals